Germán Sierra Sánchez (born 27 September 1956) is a Mexican politician affiliated with the Institutional Revolutionary Party. As of 2014 he served as Senator of the LV, LVI, LVIII and LIX Legislatures of the Mexican Congress representing Puebla and as Deputy of the LIII.

References

1956 births
Living people
People from Puebla (city)
Members of the Senate of the Republic (Mexico)
Members of the Chamber of Deputies (Mexico)
Presidents of the Senate of the Republic (Mexico)
Institutional Revolutionary Party politicians
21st-century Mexican politicians